The word saint derives from the Latin sanctus, meaning holy, and has long been used in Christianity to refer to a person who was recognized as having lived a holy life and as being an exemplar and model for other Christians.  Beginning in the 10th century, the Catholic Church began to centralise and formalise the process of recognising saints; the process whereby an individual was added to the canon (list) of recognised saints became known as canonisation.

Saints who had been canonized when the Church of England was in communion with Rome generally continued to be recognized as saints after the English Reformation in the 16th century.

Since the split with Rome, the Church of England sometimes uses the word hero or heroine to recognise those holy people whom the church synod or an individual church praises as having had special benevolence.  It considers such muted terms a reversion to a more simple and cautious doctrine which emphasises empowerment (subsidiarity) to all members and components of the church.

The provinces of the Anglican Communion therefore commemorate many of the saints in the General Roman Calendar, often on the same days.

In some cases, Anglican Calendars have kept pre-1954 celebratory days that the Roman Catholic Church has since moved or abolished.

Early Christianity

Like the Roman Catholic Church, the Anglican Communion has special holy days in honour of Jesus Christ, the Blessed Virgin Mary and the Apostles. Many of the parish churches in the Communion have the names Christ Church, and St. Mary the Virgin. The same can also be said for the four great patrons of Great Britain and Ireland, Saint George (England), Saint David (Wales), Saint Patrick (Ireland), and Saint Andrew (Scotland).

English saints

English and local saints are often emphasised, and there are differences between the provinces' calendars. King Charles I of England is the only person to have been treated as a new saint by some Anglicans following the English Reformation, after which he was referred to as a martyr and included briefly in a calendar of the Book of Common Prayer. This canonisation is, however, considered neither universal nor official in the Anglican Communion worldwide, and many national Churches list him as a martyr and not a Saint, or as neither.

English martyrs

There are several persons commemorated in the modern Anglican calendars who were opposed to the Roman Catholic Church. Of particular note are John Wycliffe and William Tyndale, for beginning the full translation of the Bible into English (a project which led to the Geneva Bible), and for writings against the Catholic Church.

The Oxford Martyrs, Thomas Cranmer, Nicholas Ridley, and Hugh Latimer, are also commemorated for the courage they showed in death, and for their belief in a free Church of England.

Ugandan martyrs

In the 19th century, 23 Anglican and 22 Roman Catholic converts were martyred together in Uganda. The Church of England commemorates the Ugandan martyrs on 3 June together with Archbishop Janani Luwum, who was murdered in 1977 on the orders of Idi Amin. On 18 October 1964, Pope Paul VI canonised the 22 Ugandan martyrs who were Roman Catholics.

Modern notables
Anglican churches also commemorate various famous (often post-Reformation) Christians.  The West front of Westminster Abbey, for example, contains statues of 20th-century martyrs like Maximilian Kolbe, Martin Luther King Jr., Óscar Romero, Dietrich Bonhoeffer and Lucian Tapiedi (one of the Anglican New Guinea Martyrs).

Some traditional Anglican saints
 Aelred of Hexham (1110–1167), Abbot of Rievaulx—12 January
 Aidan (d. 651), Bishop of Lindisfarne—31 August
 Alban (d. between 209 and 304), protomartyr of Britain—22 June
 Alcuin of York ( 735–804), Deacon, Abbot of Tours—20 May
 Aldhelm ( 639–709), Bishop of Sherborne, shrines at Salisbury and Canterbury—25 May
 Alfred the Great (849–899), King of Wessex
 Alphege (954–1012), Archbishop of Canterbury, Martyr—19 April
 Anselm of Canterbury ( 1033–1109), Archbishop of Canterbury
 Augustine of Canterbury (d.  604), first Archbishop of Canterbury—26 May
 Benedict Biscop ( 628–690), Abbot of Wearmouth—13 January
 Birinus ( 600–649), Bishop of Dorchester, Apostle of Wessex—4 September (Church of England), 3 December (Roman Catholic)
 Brigid ( 451–525), Abbess of Kildare—1 February
 Cedd ( 620–644), Abbot of Lastingham, Bishop of the East Saxons—26 October
 Chad (d. 672), Bishop of Lichfield—2 March
 Charles I of England (1600–1649), King of England, Scotland, and Ireland—30 January
 Columba (521–597), Abbot of Iona, Missionary—9 June
 Crispin and Crispinian (d.  286)—25 October. Immortalised as Saint Crispin's Day in Henry V by Shakespeare
 Cuthbert ( 634–687), Bishop of Lindisfarne—Church of England 29 March; Church in Wales 4 September); Episcopal Church (USA) 31 August
 Dunstan ( 909–989), Archbishop of Canterbury—19 May
 Edmund the Martyr (d. 869), King of the East Angles, Martyr
 Edward the Confessor ( 1003 to 1005 – 1066), King of England—13 October (translation of relics)
 Etheldreda ( 636–679), Abbess of Ely—23 June
 Felix of Burgundy (d. 647 or 648), Bishop, Apostle to the East Angles—8 March
 Frideswide, Prioress at Oxford (Christ Church)
 George, allegedly martyred at Nicomedia in 303, his major shrine was at Constantinople, patron saint of England
 Robert Grosseteste ( 1175–1253), Bishop of Lincoln, Philosopher, Scientist
 Hilda ( 614–680), Abbess of Whitby
 Hugh (1135 to 1140–1200), Carthusian monk and Bishop of Lincoln—17 November
 Julian of Norwich ( 1342 – c. 1416), spiritual writer, mystic—8 May, 13 May
 Margery Kempe ( 1373 – after 1438), housewife and mystic
 Margaret ( 1045–1093), Queen of Scotland, mystic—10 June or 16 November
 Mellitus (d. 624), first Bishop of London—24 April
 Mildred (ca. 660–730), Abbess of Minster-in-Thanet—13 July
 Kentigern (d. 614), Bishop of Cumbria—13 January
 Ninian (4th or 5th century), Bishop of Galloway, Apostle of the Picts—16 September
 Osmund (d. 1099), Bishop of Salisbury—4 December
 Oswald ( 604–642), King of Northumbria, martyr—5 August
 Oswald of Worcester (d. 992), bishop of Worcester—29/28 February
 Paulinus of York (d. 644), Archbishop of York, missionary—10 October
 Petroc (d.  564), missionary to the West Country—4 June
 Piran (d.  480), patron saint of Cornwall and tinners—5 March
 Richard, Bishop of Chichester (1197–1253)
 Richard Rolle (1290–1349) of Hampole, spiritual writer
 Edmund Rich of Abingdon (1175–1240), Archbishop of Canterbury—16 November
 Swithun (d.  862), Bishop of Winchester—15 July in England and 2 July in Norway
 Theodore of Tarsus (602–690), Archbishop of Canterbury—19 September
 Thomas Becket ( 1118–1170), Archbishop of Canterbury, martyr—29 December
 Thomas de Cantilupe (1218-82), bishop of Hereford—25 August/2 October
 William Tyndale ( 1494–1536), translator of the Scriptures, martyr—6 October
 The Venerable Bede (672 or 673–735), monk at Jarrow, scholar, historian—western churches 25 May, and Orthodox churches 27 May
 Wilfrid ( 633- 709), bishop, missionary
 William of Ockham ( 1287–1347), friar, philosopher
 William of York (1141-53), bishop—8 June
 William of Perth (d. ca. 1201), pilgrim, enshrined at Rochester Cathedral—23 May/22April
 Willibrord of York ( 658–739), bishop, Apostle of Frisia—7 November
 Wulfstan (d. 1095), Bishop of Worcester—19 January

Examples of modern Anglican saints
The ninth Lambeth Conference held in 1958 clarified the commemoration of Saints and Heroes of the Christian Church in the Anglican Communion. Resolution 79 stated:
In the case of scriptural saints, care should be taken to commemorate men or women in terms which are in strict accord with the facts made known in Holy Scripture.
In the case of other names, the Calendar should be limited to those whose historical character and devotion are beyond doubt.
In the choice of new names economy should be observed and controversial names should not be inserted until they can be seen in the perspective of history.
The addition of a new name should normally result from a widespread desire expressed in the region concerned over a reasonable period of time.

Modern Anglican saints

The following have been identified as heroes of the Christian Church in the Anglican Communion (post-Reformation individuals commemorated in the Church of England Calendar, excluding those primarily venerated by the Roman Catholic or Orthodox churches):

Lancelot Andrewes (1555–1626), Bishop of Winchester, spiritual writer, theologian
Anthony Ashley-Cooper (1801–1885), Earl of Shaftesbury, social reformer
Vedanayagam Samuel Azariah (1874–1945), bishop in South India, evangelist
Samuel Barnett (1844–1913) and Henrietta Barnett (1851–1936), social reformers
Richard Baxter (1615–1691), Puritan divine
Dietrich Bonhoeffer (1906–1945), Lutheran pastor, martyr
William Booth (1829–1912) and Catherine Booth (1829–1890), founders of the Salvation Army
Thomas Bray (1658–1730), founder of the SPCK
John Bunyan (1628–1688), spiritual writer
Joseph Butler (1692–1752), Bishop of Durham, philosopher
Josephine Butler (1828–1906), social reformer
John Calvin (1509–1564), reformer
Wilson Carlile (1847–1942), founder of the Church Army
Edith Cavell (1865–1915), nurse
Charles I (1600–1649), king and martyr
Caroline Chisholm (1808–1877), social reformer
Thomas Cranmer (1489–1556), Archbishop of Canterbury, Reformation martyr
John Donne (1572–1631), priest, poet
Elizabeth Ferard (1825–1883), first Deaconess of the Church of England, founder of the Community of St Andrew
Nicholas Ferrar (1592–1637), deacon, founder of the Little Gidding community
George Fox (1624–1691), founder of the Society of Friends (the Quakers)
Elizabeth Fry (1780–1845), prison reformer
Allen Gardiner (1794–1851), missionary, founder of the South American Mission Society
Isabella Gilmore (1842–1923), deaconess
Charles Gore (1853–1932), bishop, founder of the Community of the Resurrection
James Hannington (1847–1885), bishop of Eastern Equatorial Africa, martyr in Uganda
George Herbert (1593–1633), priest, poet
Octavia Hill (1838–1912), social reformer
Richard Hooker (1554–1600), priest, apologist, theologian
Eglantyne Jebb (1876–1928), social reformer, founder of 'Save The Children'
Samuel Johnson (1709–1784), moralist
John Keble (1792–1866), priest, tractarian, poet
Thomas Ken (1637–1711), Bishop of Bath and Wells
Geoffrey Studdert Kennedy (1883–1929), priest, poet
Edward King (1829–1920), Bishop of Lincoln
Apolo Kivebulaya (c. 1864–1933), priest, evangelist in Central Africa
Ini Kopuria (d. 1945), founder of the Melanesian Brotherhood
Hugh Latimer (c. 1487–1555), Bishop of Worcester, Reformation martyr
William Laud (1573–1645), Archbishop of Canterbury
William Law (1686–1761), priest, spiritual writer,
Charles Fuge Lowder (1820–1880), priest
Martin Luther (1483–1546), reformer
Janani Luwum (c. 1922–1977), Archbishop of Uganda, martyr
Frederick Denison Maurice (1805–1872), priest
Henry Martyn (1781–1812), translator of the Scriptures, missionary in India and Persia
Bernard Mizeki (c. 1861–1896), apostle of the MaShona, martyr
Harriet Monsell (1811–1883), founder of the Community of St John the Baptist
John Mason Neale (1818–1866), priest, hymn writer
John Henry Newman (1801–1890), Cardinal, tractarian, theologian
Florence Nightingale (1820–1910), nurse, social reformer
John Coleridge Patteson (1827–1871), first Bishop of Melanesia and martyr
Edward Bouverie Pusey (1800–1882), priest, tractarian
Pandita Mary Ramabai (1858–1922), translator of the Scriptures
Nicholas Ridley (c. 1500–1555), Bishop of London, Reformation martyr
Óscar Romero (1917–1980), Archbishop of San Salvador, martyr
Christina Rossetti (1830–1894), poet
Samuel Seabury (1729–1796), first Anglican bishop in North America
Priscilla Lydia Sellon, a restorer of the religious life in the Church of England
George Augustus Selwyn (1809–1878), first Anglican Bishop of New Zealand
Sadhu Sundar Singh ( 1889– ? ), evangelist, teacher of the Faith
Mary Slessor (1848–1915), missionary in West Africa
Mary Sumner (1828–1921), founder of the Mothers' Union
Jeremy Taylor (1613–1667), Bishop of Down and Connor
William Temple (1881–1944), Archbishop of Canterbury
Thomas Traherne (1636 or 1637–1674), poet, spiritual writer
William Tyndale (c. 1494–1536), translator of the Scriptures, Reformation martyr
Evelyn Underhill (1875–1941), spiritual writer
Henry Venn (1725–1797), John Venn (1759–1813), and Henry Venn the younger (1796–1873), priests, evangelical divines
Isaac Watts (1674–1748), hymn writer
Charles Wesley (1707–1788), evangelist, hymn writer
John Wesley (1703–1791), priest, evangelist, founder of Methodism
John West (1778–1845), missionary and the first Anglican priest in Western Canada
William Wilberforce (1759–1833), social reformer

See also
List of Anglican Church calendars
List of saints
Saints in Methodism

References

Further reading
 1958 Lambeth Conference resolution on The Commemoration of Saints and Heroes of the Christian Church in the Anglican Communion
 The Commemoration of Saints and Heroes of the Faith in the Anglican Communion; the report of a Commission appointed by the Archbishop of Canterbury. London, S.P.C.K., 1957.

 
Anglican Mariology
Anglicanism
Church of England lists